The Aichi E11A (九八夜偵, Kyū-hachi Yatei) was an Imperial Japanese Navy flying boat used during the first year of World War II for maritime patrol duties. The Allied reporting name for the type was "Laura"; the Japanese Navy designation was "Type 98 Reconnaissance Seaplane". The Type 98 was quite similar to the earlier E10A Type 96, whose allied name was "Hank". "Lauras" were rare - only 17 were built. It was designed to be launched from cruisers or battleships in order to spot their shellfire at night. The Type 98s were soon diverted to communications and transport duties.

Variants
 E11A1 : Night reconnaissance flying boat for the Imperial Japanese Navy. Production version.

Specifications (Aichi E11A1)

See also

References

Notes

Bibliography

 Francillon, René J. Japanese Aircraft of the Pacific War. London: Putnam & Company Ltd., 1970 (2nd edition 1979). . Pages 489-490.
 Green, William. Warplanes of the Second World War, Volume Five: Flying Boats. London: Macdonald & Co.(Publishers) Ltd., 1962 (5th impression 1972). . Pages 124-125.

External links

E11A
E11A, Aichi
Flying boats
Biplanes
Single-engined pusher aircraft
Aircraft first flown in 1937